The Pacific Motorway is a 127-kilometre (79 mi) motorway linking Sydney to Newcastle via the Central Coast and Hunter regions of New South Wales. Formerly known but still commonly referred to by both the public and the government as the F3 Freeway, Sydney–Newcastle Freeway, and Sydney–Newcastle Expressway, it is part of the AusLink road corridor between Sydney and Brisbane. The name "F3 Freeway" reflects its former route allocation before it was decommissioned and replaced by the rollout of alphanumeric signposts.

Route 
At its southern end, the freeway starts at Pennant Hills Road, Wahroonga with the Northern intersection of Northconnex, near its junction with the Pacific Highway (Pearces Corner) in Sydney's north. It heads north, skirting the western edge of the Ku-ring-gai Chase National Park, running parallel with the railway line until it descends to the Hawkesbury River, crossing at Kangaroo Point in Brooklyn. Immediately north of the river, the Hawkesbury River interchange provides access to Brooklyn and Mooney Mooney before the road climbs. At Mount White there are major heavy vehicle checking stations on both northbound and southbound carriageways, to assess compliance and roadworthiness of trucks.

The freeway passes through the Brisbane Water National Park, and the Calga interchange gives access to Peats Ridge.

After Kariong, the freeway continues through rural and semi-rural areas of the Central Coast with interchanges at Ourimbah, Tuggerah, Warnervale and Kiar, near Doyalson. From the Doyalson interchange the freeway continues to the west of Lake Macquarie with interchanges near Morisset, Cessnock, Toronto and West Wallsend.

At the West Wallsend interchange the Newcastle Link Road (A15) takes traffic into Newcastle via Wallsend and also connects with the M15 Hunter Expressway towards Kurri Kurri and Singleton, while the freeway continues north to end at the signalised intersection at the junction of Weakleys Drive and John Renshaw Drive, Beresfield. Prior to November 2018, the intersection was a roundabout and conversion and upgrade works was completed in March 2019. From here traffic bound for Highway 1 takes John Renshaw Drive and the New England Highway eastwards to meet the Pacific Highway at Hexham, and Weakleys Drive connects with the New England Highway towards Maitland.

Between Wahroonga and Ourimbah the freeway passes through rugged sandstone country, particularly as it descends to and ascends from the Hawkesbury River. This section of the freeway is characterised by deep cuttings and extensive embankments.

History

Early planning
Planning for the freeway began in 1952, with the aim of providing a high-speed replacement for a section of the Pacific Highway that had been built in 1925–30 which was struggling to cope with the increased traffic. It was planned that the freeway would connect to the freeway systems being proposed for both Sydney and Newcastle, providing a city-to-city freeway link.

The route between Mount White and Kariong was originally planned to be further south than the route as built, with an easier crossing of Mooney Mooney Creek. By the time that construction on this section was to begin, resistance from the National Parks & Wildlife Service to the proposed route forced the Department of Main Roads to take a route through Calga, using part of the first stage of a proposed freeway route to Singleton which had been built the 1960s. That scheme has never been further developed.

The route through Wyong Shire also changed; instead of passing east of Wyong along the western edge of the Tuggerah Lakes, development in that area forced the freeway to be moved to the west of Wyong, with link roads being constructed to meet the Pacific Highway near Doyalson and Tuggerah.

In addition, the freeway was revised to go to the west of Lake Macquarie rather than the east, and thereby bypass Newcastle. One of the reasons for this change of location was the issue of connectivity to the Pacific Highway north of Newcastle, as the route of the Newcastle Inner City Bypass, which would have provided a northern extension of the freeway, is problematic in terms of its northern terminus point at Sandgate not easily allowing for a northward freeway-standard route to join to the Pacific Highway.

Construction
The major stages in the construction of the freeway were:
April 1963 – Construction began on the  section from the Hawkesbury River to Mount White. This was opened as a toll road in December 1965.
October 1966 – Opening of the Mount White-Calga section (including first section of proposed freeway to link to the New England Highway at Singleton).
December 1968 – Opening of Berowra to Hawkesbury River section as a toll road.
October 1973 – Completion of the Brooklyn Bridge, thereby connecting the Berowra-Hawkesbury River and Hawkesbury River-Calga sections. At this time the separate tolls for the sections north and south of the Hawkesbury (20 cents for each section) were abolished and a single toll of 50 cents was introduced. This was collected at the Berowra toll booths, and the Mooney Mooney toll booths were removed. The toll was removed in 1990 when the Federal Government adopted a policy that a condition of its direct funding of the national highways was that they were to be toll free.
December 1983 – Concurrent opening of the Somersby to Ourimbah and Kangy Angy to Wallarah Creek sections, including the single carriageway motorway link from Wallarah Creek to the Pacific Highway at Doyalson.
December 1986 – Opening of the  section between Calga and Somersby including the Mooney Mooney Bridge.
September 1987 – Freeway completed from Wallarah Creek interchange to Mandalong Road interchange.
March 1988 – Freeway completed from Mandalong Road interchange to Freemans Waterhole interchange.
March 1989 – Wahroonga to Berowra section opened 
December 1990 – Section from Freemans Waterhole Interchange to Palmer's Road completed.
December 1993 – Palmer's Road to Minmi section opened.
December 1997 – "Missing link" between Ourimbah and Kangy Angy opened.
November 1998 – Final stage of freeway opened between Minmi and John Renshaw Drive, Beresfield.

The motorway has also undergone several upgrades:
December 2004 – Completion of widening to six lanes of the four-lane sections between the Hawkesbury River and Calga. As part of this work, a new south bound truck weighing station was built at Mount White to replace the facility at Berowra. The station was built on the existing two-lane alignment, and a new three-lane south bound alignment was built for car traffic.
This work was completed in three stages; stage 1 – Cowan to Berowra, completed September 2008, stage 2 – Berowra to Mount Kuring-Gai, completed September 2009) and stage 3 – Mount Kuring-Gai to Mount Colah, completed November 2009.
 August 2013 – road signs were changed to show the new M1 marker and the new name "Pacific Motorway" as part of a new statewide alpha numeric route scheme.
 March 2019 – Replacement of the roundabout on Pacific Motorway, John Renshaw, and Weakleys Drives with a signalised intersection.
 May 2020 – Completion of widening the Pacific Motorway to three lanes in each direction from Kariong to Somersby.
 June 2020 – Completion of Widening the Pacific Motorway to three lanes in each direction from Tuggerah to Doyalson.
October 2021 – Extension of extension to Raymond Terrace announced
A number of interim F3 Freeway and National Highway 1 sections existed which have since been downgraded to local roads. These sections were used by freeway traffic until bypasses or new alignments were constructed.
 Peats Ridge Road, used between 1966 (opening of Mount White–Calga section) and 1986. The road opened to traffic in 1964 and linked the freeway at Calga with the Pacific Highway at Ourimbah until it was bypassed by a more direct alignment. The section between Calga and Peats Ridge was an upgrade of an existing road, while the section from Peats Ridge to Ourimbah was a new grade-separated, two-lane road with long sections of third lane. The section from Somersby to Ourimbah was rebuilt to form part of the Freeway and opened in 1983.
Freeway and Pacific Highway traffic shared this section until it was bypassed in 1997.
 Motorway Link, used between 1983 and 1988. It was the interim northern end of the freeway and still connects directly to Pacific Highway after the freeway was extended.
 The section of Lenaghans Drive north of Stockrington Road, used 1993 and 1998. It was the interim northern end of the freeway and connected directly to the John Renshaw Drive intersection.

"F3" designation 

The freeway at one stage carried the Freeway Route 3 (F3) designation. This route numbering system, introduced in 1973, was to provide distinctive route numbering and signage for freeways in Sydney and the surrounding areas. However, it was quickly replaced by the National Highway 1 designation in 1974. Despite so, route was still often referred to as the F3 Freeway, with this title being used not only colloquially but on state and federal government documents and web sites and some road signs. Following the introduction of alphanumeric route markers, the use of the F3 Freeway name was discontinued in favour of the new M1 Pacific Motorway designation.

Proposed upgrades and connections 

Strong public resistance in the 1970s to freeways being constructed within cities and unfavourable outcomes of government inquiries resulted in several freeway proposals in Sydney being abandoned. This included the connecting Lane Cove Valley and North Western Expressways, which means that the Pacific Highway (a six lane urban arterial) continues to be the connecting route between the freeway's southern terminus at Wahroonga and the city centre. In October 2020, NorthConnex opened via an alternative route, connecting the M1 at Wahroonga with the M2 near the Pennant Hills Road interchange. Through traffic can proceed to the city centre via the Lane Cove Tunnel or to the Hume Highway via the M7.

Northern extension to Raymond Terrace
Originally part of the upgrade of the Pacific Highway but now a separate project, an extension of the Pacific Motorway is proposed to be constructed between the existing northern end and the Raymond Terrace bypass of the Pacific Highway. This section of John Renshaw Drive and the Pacific Highway between these two points is currently a major bottleneck during holiday and long weekend periods, with delays lasting hours not uncommon. The layout of the twin bridges across the Hunter River at Hexham was designed primarily for local traffic to and from Newcastle, rather than to connect the Pacific Highway north of Newcastle to the freeway.

The Environment Impact Statement (EIS) of the extension was released in July 2021. The extension is expected to be completed by 2028.

Traffic disruption 
Other than the Pacific Highway, which the freeway has superseded, the freeway is the only direct route between Sydney and the Central Coast, and is the major road route for road transport from Sydney to the Hunter region, northern NSW and Queensland. The freeway thus carries a heavy mix of commuter traffic, road freight transport, and (periodically) holiday and recreational travellers. It often suffers from traffic disruptions, generally associated with traffic volume and congestion related to on-road breakdowns and vehicle accidents, or natural disasters (in particular, bushfire).

In addition traffic on the freeway is frequently affected by vehicle crashes, often involving trucks. These events have encouraged the NSW motoring organisation NRMA to call for more freight to be moved by rail to reduce the number of trucks using the freeway.

Bushfires have caused closure of the freeway and the nearby railway line and Pacific Highway between Sydney and the Hawkesbury River on a number of occasions. One such event of this type was recorded on 21 and 22 January 2007, when a fire broke out in the adjoining Ku-ring-gai Chase National Park. The fire forced the closure of the two roads and the railway line between Sydney and the Central Coast, resulting in extended disruption to traffic flow.

Because of the frequency of these disruptions to traffic flow, arguments for a second major freeway north from the Sydney metropolitan area continue to be pushed forward. However topography and resultant cost rules this out for practical purposes, other than indirect routes crossing the Hawkesbury in the vicinity of Wiseman's Ferry, some 30 km upstream of the current crossing.

Following criticism of significant delays due to accidents and blockages, the NSW Roads and Traffic Authority announced in 2010 that it was undertaking a $28 million emergency plan for the freeway which involved the development of a 40 km/h contraflow traffic scheme to allow vehicles to travel around an accident.

Traffic volume 
The Annual average daily traffic (AADT) data from the Roads & Traffic Authority showed a decline in traffic volume on the freeway near its southern end at Wahroonga, from 78,600 in 2002 to about 76,600 in 2005 and then to 75,800 in 2006.

The 2004 AADT figures for other locations on the freeway include 73,400 at Mooney Mooney, just north of the Hawkesbury River bridge, 60,100 near Wyong, 38,500 near Wyee, 27,000 near Freemans Waterhole and 33,000 near its northern terminus at Beresfield.

Interchanges

See also 

 The F3 Derby
 Freeways in Australia
 Freeways in New South Wales

References

External links 
Sydney-Newcastle Freeway at Ozroads Detailed site containing many existing and historical images.
Live Traffic NSW F3 Traffic Cameras
Pacific Motorway NSW Traffic Incident alerts & detailed traffic for the Sydney-Newcastle Pacific Motorway

Articles containing video clips
Highways in New South Wales
Roads in the Hunter Region
Former toll roads in Australia
Highway 1 (Australia)
Pacific Highway (Australia)